Matopeni is a slum in Kenya. It is on the outskirts of Nairobi. Its residents belong to a variety of ethnic groups. 
 The population of Matopeni exceeds 30,000 persons. The situation in Matopeni is serious, even by Nairobi slum standards. 
A Matopeni Secondary School exists. The first political Leader to represent matopeni is Abdi Hassan Guyo

References

Suburbs of Nairobi
Slums in Kenya